Ivan McKinley (born 15 June 1969) is a retired South African soccer player who played in Major League Soccer from 1996 to 2002 with the Tampa Bay Mutiny, the New England Revolution, the Miami Fusion and DC United.

After graduating from Hillview High School, Pretoria in 1986, McKinley attended the College of Boca Raton from 1987 to 1991. He was a two-time NAIA All American soccer player at Boca Raton. In 1991, he signed with the Fort Lauderdale Strikers in the American Professional Soccer League. He played with the Strikers through the 1994 season. In 1995, he played for Neuchâtel Xamax in the Swiss First Division. He finished the year with Wits University FC in South African Premier Soccer League.

In 2004, he played five games for the Charleston Battery in the USL First Division.

References

1969 births
Living people
Sportspeople from Johannesburg
American Professional Soccer League players
Charleston Battery players
D.C. United players
Fort Lauderdale Strikers (1988–1994) players
Miami Fusion players
Neuchâtel Xamax FCS players
Swiss Super League players
New England Revolution players
South African soccer players
South African expatriate soccer players
South Africa international soccer players
Tampa Bay Mutiny players
USL First Division players
Major League Soccer players
Bidvest Wits F.C. players
Lynn Fighting Knights men's soccer players
Expatriate footballers in Switzerland
South African expatriate sportspeople in Switzerland
Expatriate soccer players in the United States
South African expatriate sportspeople in the United States
Association football defenders